Houghton-Portage Township Schools (abbr. HPTS) is a school district that covers the city of Houghton, Michigan and Portage Township. It includes three schools: Houghton Elementary School, Houghton Middle School, and Houghton High School.

References

School districts in Michigan
Education in Houghton County, Michigan
Houghton, Michigan